Sky Science Powered Parachutes Limited was a British aircraft manufacturer and parachute training and service provider, based in Tidworth, Wiltshire. The company specialized in the design and manufacture of powered parachutes in the form of kits for amateur construction in the European Fédération Aéronautique Internationale microlight and homebuilt categories.

The company seems to have been founded about 2000 and gone out of business in late 2003.

The company provided a range of services including parachuting, training, sales and rigging, rentals of Russian aircraft and a parachute display team. The company also offered a single design of powered parachute, the Sky Science PowerHawk. The prototype was registered in 2000, but removed from the register by the British Civil Aviation Authority in 2005, without any indication of further sales of the type.

Aircraft

References

External links
Company website at Archive.org

Companies based in Wiltshire
Defunct aircraft manufacturers of the United Kingdom
Homebuilt aircraft
Parachuting in the United Kingdom
Powered parachutes
Ultralight aircraft